Proscelidodon is an extinct genus of ground sloths in the family Scelidotheriidae. It lived during the Miocene and Pliocene of what is now Argentina and Bolivia. The genus was described in 1935.

Taxonomy 
During the Quaternary the taxonomic diversification of the Scelidotheriidae took place, with four species belonging to the genera Scelidodon, Catonyx, and Scelidotherium; the pre-quaternary Scelidotheriidae are rare. The discovery of an almost complete maxilla of Proscelidodon from the Maimará Formation (late Miocene), Jujuy province, provides new data on the plesiomorphic condition of the clade, the biogeographical history of the group during the Mio–Pliocene, and on the Maimará faunal assemblage.
In addition, fossils assigned to Proscelidodon have also been found in the Cerro Azul Formation in Argentina.

References 

Prehistoric sloths
Prehistoric placental genera
Miocene xenarthrans
Pliocene xenarthrans
Messinian first appearances
Pliocene extinctions
Miocene mammals of South America
Pliocene mammals of South America
Huayquerian
Montehermosan
Chapadmalalan
Neogene Argentina
Fossils of Argentina
Neogene Bolivia
Fossils of Bolivia
Cerro Azul Formation
Fossil taxa described in 1935